North Goa district is one of the two districts that constitutes the state of Goa, India.

Historical background

At the advent of the Portuguese in AD 1510, all of today's northern territories (Ilhas, Bardez, Pernem, Bicholim, Antruz, and Sattari) were part of the Bijapur Sultanate. Ilhas and Bardez were annexed by Portugal after their successful conquest and the region is now called Velhas Conquistas (Old Conquests). After the fall of the Deccan sultanates and rise of the Marathas in the late 1600s, the remaining region eventually fell under the control of the Maratha Kingdom of Sawantwadi until AD 1783. These territories were seen as safe haven for the Hindus, Muslims and new-Christians who fled the Portuguese Inquisition taking place in Goa. These territories were acquired by Portuguese as part of Novas Conquistas (New Conquest) in the late 18th centuries. They remained with the Portuguese until 1961 when they were annexed by India.

Goa and two other former Portuguese enclaves became the union territory of Goa, Daman, and Diu, and Goa was organized into a single district in 1965. On 30 May 1987, Goa attained statehood (while Daman and Diu remained a union territory), and Goa was reorganized into two districts, North Goa and South Goa.

Portuguese in Goa (1510–1961)

Advent of Portuguese (1498) 
Lured by the thrill of discovery and goaded by the prospect of seeking Christians and spices Portugal embarked on perilous voyages to the Orient which culminated in Bartholomew Dias’ trip around the Cape of Good Hope. This spectacular breakthrough opened new vistas. A decade later Vasco Da Gama set off eastwards and in AD 1498 landed in Calicut and broke the Arab monopoly of trade.

Estado Da India (1510) 
Fired with the dream of establishing an Eastern Empire for Portugal, Afonso De Albuquerque, Governor-General of Goa, set to acquire strategic centers also the trade route. At the invitation of the Admiral of the Vijayanagar's fleet, he occupied Goa with little initial opposition. Though temporarily routed, he triumphantly regained possession of the city on 25 November 1510, and kneeling in the public square he dedicated Goa to St. Catherine whose feast was on that day.

In 1530 Goa became the capital of the Portuguese Empire in the East and mistress of the sea from the Cape of Good Hope to the China Sea.

Saint Francis Xavier (1542–1552) 
The arrival in AD 1542 of a young Spanish nobleman turned Jesuit, with a brilliant background of academic learning, created an impact that was tremendous. His compassion for the weak and the downtrodden, his dynamic zeal and his innate holiness edified many. Two years after his death in AD 1552, the incorrupt body of the saint was enshrined in Goa. It continued to attract pilgrims from all over the world even to this day.

India's first printing press (1556) 
The first printing press of moveable types in the whole of India printed Doutrina Christa written by Francis Xavier & Garcia de Orta called Colloquios Dos Simples Drogos Medicinais and an early work of the poet Luis De Camoes entitled Os Disparates Da India.

Indian Incersions (1946–1961)

Jai Hind Movement (1946) 
To intensify the flickering torch of freedom, the Indian Socialist leader, Dr. Ram Manohar Lohia, courted arrest on 18 June 1946 by defiantly addressing a mammoth meeting in Goa.

In August 1946, at Londa on the border, a mass meeting of Goan nationalist workers charted out a plan of non-violent action. To express the peoples's longing for freedom, satyagrahas were launched until the year ended in different parts of the Portuguese enclaves and resulted in 1500 Goans being imprisoned and the ring leaders deported.

Goa Action Committee (1953) 
After the French withdrawal from India, a futile attempt was made by the Government of India to negotiate with Portugal for a peaceful transfer of its possession to the Indian Union. Consequently, the Goa Action Committee was formed in Bombay to awaken sympathy for its cause within the country and abroad.

Operation Vijaya (1961) 
In 1958 all parties amalgamated under the banner of Goan Political Convention presided over by Professor Aloysius Soares.

In a carefully planned action by Armed forces, the Government of India entered Goa. Scant resistance was offered and in December 1961 with hardly any bloodshed, Goa was liberated from the Portuguese to remove the last vestiges of foreign domination in India.

Geography
Its geographical position is marked by 15° 48′ 00″ N to 14° 53′ 54″ N latitudes and 73° E to 75° E longitudes

Climate

Politics
  

 
|}

Administration
The administrative headquarters of the district is Panaji, which is also the capital of the state of Goa. The district forms part of a greater region called the Konkan. Ms Mamu Hage,  IAS, is the District Collector.

The district is divided into three subdivisions — Panaji, Mapusa, and Bicholim; and five talukas —Tiswadi (Panaji), Bardez (Mapusa), Pernem, Bicholim, and Sattari (Valpoi).

Ponda taluka moved from North Goa to South Goa in January 2015.

Demographics

Population 
According to the 2011 census North Goa has a population of 8,18,008 which is roughly equal to the nation of Comoros or the US state of South Dakota. This gives it a ranking of 480th in India (out of a total of 640). Its population growth rate over the decade 2001–2011 was 7.8%. North Goa has a sex ratio of 959 females for every 1000 males, and a literacy rate of 88.85%.

Language 

Konkani is the mother tongue of a majority of the people living in North Goa district.  Portuguese is also spoken and understood by a small number of people.

At the time of the 2011 Census of India, 65.86% of the population in the district spoke Konkani, 14.36% Marathi, 8.65% Hindi, 3.62% Kannada, 2.39% Urdu, 0.92 Portuguese, 0.86 English, 0.80 
Malayalam, 0.68% Telugu, 0.47% Tamil, 0.46% Gujarati and 0.43% Bengali as their first language.

Religion 

Hinduism (76%) is followed by the majority of population of North Goa. Christians (16%) form significant minority.

Tourism 

North Goa is known for its beaches, which include Anjuna Beach, Candolim Beach, Mandrem Beach, Calangute Beach, Morjim Beach, and Arambol Beach. Other tourist sites include Fort Aguada, The church of Mae De Deus and the temple of Boghdeshwara. Chorao, Divar Island are islands of North Goa which are accessible via a ferry crossing.

References

External links

North Goa District Website 

 
Districts of Goa
1987 establishments in Goa